Lanka  is the name given in Hindu epics to the island fortress capital of the legendary demon king Ravana in the epics of the Ramayana and the Mahabharata. The fortress was situated on a plateau between three mountain peaks known as the Trikuta Mountains. The ancient city of Lankapura is thought to have been burnt down by Hanuman. After its king, Ravana, was killed by Rama with the help of Ravana's brother Vibhishana, the latter was crowned king of Lankapura. The mythological site of Lankā is identified with Sri Lanka. Vibhishana was given immortality when Rama was leaving the world to go back to Vaikuntha, he is said to still rule the kingdom during the period of the Pandavas and also to this day.. According to the Mahabharata, the Pandava Sahadeva visited this kingdom during his southern military campaign for the rajasuya of Yudhishthira.

Rulers of Lanka 
According to both the Ramayana and the Mahabharata, Lanka was originally ruled by a rakshasa named Sumali. According to Uttara Kanda, Lanka was originally built by the divine architect of Devas, Vishwakarma for Lord Shiva, but was seized by the brothers, Malyavan, Sumali and Mali. The brothers ruled for thousands of years and invaded Amaravati (mythology) (the capital of Devas). After suffering a humiliating and disastrous defeat at the hands of Lord Vishnu, the brothers were too ashamed to return to Lanka. Kubera seized control of Lanka and established the Yaksha Kingdom and his capital was guarded by rakshasas. His half-brother Ravana, son of the sage Vishrava and Sumali's daughter (Kaikesi), fought with Kubera and took Lanka from him. Ravana ruled Lanka as king of the Rakshasa Kingdom. The battle in Lanka is depicted in a famous relief in the 12th-century Khmer temple of Angkor Wat. After Ravana's death, he was succeeded by his brother, Vibhishana.

Rulers 

 Heti and Praheti were the sea mammals. When Brahma made sea of the world when he was making the sea by salt water they disturbed him and so they were cursed by Brahma to become Asuras and they formed an Island Kingdom called (Lanka).
 Vidyutkesha was the son of Heti
 Sukesha was the son of Vidutkesha
 Malyavan, Sumali and Mali were the sons of Sukesha.
 Kubera was a Yaksha King. By the order of lord Vishnu, he remade and ruled Lanka.
 Ravana forced his elder brother Kubera to run away from Lanka after his penance to Brahma and Shiva and became the prince of Lanka and Sumali again became the King of Lanka. After Sumali's death, He became the ruler of Lanka.
 Vibhishana after Ravana's death and on the order of lord Rama, He ruled Lanka. He was given immortality by Rama, thus he rules Lanka and the Rakshasas ever since.

References

Rakshasa in the Ramayana
rulers